The Vinyl Cafe On Tour (1999) is a two-CD album by Stuart McLean released by Vinyl Cafe Productions.

This collection of stories was taken from CBC Radio concerts that were taped in St. John's, Halifax, Guelph, Calgary, and Victoria.

Recorded in concert for the CBC Radio show The Vinyl Cafe.

Track listing
Disc 1
 "Late Date" - 13:26
 "Morley's Christmas Concert" - 23:53
 "School Lunch" - 16:00
 "The Fly" - 19:04

Disc 2
 "Harrison Ford's Toes" – 22:45
 "Blood Pressure Chair" – 15:21
 "Sam's Birthday" – 17:35
 "Cousin Dorothy" – 16:32

See also
Stuart McLean
The Vinyl Cafe
List of Dave and Morley stories

References

External links
 Vinyl Cafe with Stuart McLean - The Official Website

Stuart McLean albums
1999 live albums